The Tiger's Trail is a 1919 American adventure film serial starring Ruth Roland, directed by Robert Ellis, Louis J. Gasnier and Paul Hurst. A "fragmentary print" from the serial survives.

Plot
As described in a film magazine, Grim Gordon (Strong) is in possession of the Tiger Idol, stolen from a religious sect of Hindu tiger worshipers on an East Indian island that he and Peter Strong and Col. Boyd visited years earlier. The two latter men were killed, but Belle Boyd (Roland), daughter of the colonel, is alive and has part of the "Pact of Three," a document torn into three parts that shows the location of a treasure discovered during the expedition. Gordon has a pitchblende mine in the western United States, and among the workers are Hindus and Tiger Worshipers. Upon her arrival from an eastern school, Belle Boyd, ward of Gordon, is attacked by a gang of outlaws headed by Bull Shotwell (Kohler), but her life is saved by Jack Randall (Larkin), a mining engineer. Jack is employed by Gordon but helps the heroine Belle in outwitting the evil forces surrounding her that are attempting to obtain her portion of the torn Pact of Three. In one episode Belle is put into a cage with a live Bengal tiger, and in others she is the subject of several kidnapping attempts.

Cast
 Ruth Roland as Belle Boyd
 George Larkin as Jack Randall
 Mark Strong as Randolph "Grim" Gordon
 Harry Moody as Tiger Face
 Fred Kohler as "Bull" Shotwell
 George Field as Salonga
 Easter Walters as Hilda, the Spy
 Bud Osborne as a henchman
 Chet Ryan as a juvenile
 Rose Dione as Faro Nell (Dance Hall Queen)

Production
This serial, about a Hindu tiger worshiping sect and western outlaws, was based on The Long Arm by C. A. Logue. (SilentEra.com states that the serial was adapted by Gilson Willets from The Long Arm by Arthur B. Reeve).

Real tigers were used in filming.  The serial includes the "famous scene" of a human chain formed from the roof of a train, which enables the criminals to steal a valuable parcel from Ruth's compartment.

Episodes
 The Tiger Worshippers
 The Glowing Eyes
 The Human Chain
 Danger Signals
 The Tiger Trap
 The Secret Assassin
 The Flaming Waters
 Danger Ahead
 The Raging Torrent
 Bringing In The Law
 In The Breakers
 The Two Amazons
 The False Idol
 The Mountain Hermit
 The Tiger Face

References

External links

1919 films
1919 adventure films
American silent serial films
American black-and-white films
American adventure films
Lost American films
Pathé Exchange film serials
Films directed by Louis J. Gasnier
Treasure hunt films
1919 lost films
Lost adventure films
Silent adventure films
1910s American films